Kaumbwe is a constituency of the National Assembly of Zambia. It was named Kapoche until being renamed in 2016, and covers part of Petauke District.

List of MPs

References

Constituencies of the National Assembly of Zambia
1973 establishments in Zambia
Constituencies established in 1973